Ici, d'ailleurs... ("Here, there..." in French) is an independent record label based in Nancy, France and established by Stéphane Grégoire in 1997 from his associative label "Sine Terra Firma". It is mainly involved with production, publishing, booking and pressing.

History

Sine Terra Firma released both first albums of Yann Tiersen, La Valse des monstres (1995) and Rue des Cascades (1996) and began to be successful.  The last compilation of the associative label, called Ici, d'ailleurs... (1996), gave its name to the indie record label.

Ici, d'ailleurs... keeps an eclectic artistic direction, with no particularly musical genre.

The release of the third Yann Tiersen album, Le Phare (1998) allowed the label to expand internationally by proposing at once French and foreign artists, not recognized or on the way to the being.

In 2002, the label created 0101, the electronic division of the label.

Two years later, Ici, d'ailleurs... created a new collection named OuMuPo, an acronym for Ouvroir de MUsique POtentiel (workshop for potential music) in reference to the OuLiPo, OUvroir de LIttérature POtentiel (workshop for potential literature). The principle is making art under constraint. Several DJ's and electronic music composers have been offered to remix the whole label catalog. But there is a twist. They have to comply with constraints issued in the Ici, d'ailleurs... Charter. A huge fan of the OuBaPo, OUvroir de BAnde-Dessinée POtentiel (workshop for potential comics), Ici d'ailleurs... asked Jean-Christophe Menu, founder member of L'Association, an independent publishing society, to be in charge of the graphic side of the project. For each new work, the OuBaPiens, French cartoonists collective, created a sixteen pages comic book which comes along on top of each OuMuPo album, each time drawn by a different person. Again, these comics are ruled by a Charter to spice up the game. The collection includes six albums.

At the end of 2004, Stéphane Grégoire wanted to both re-interpret and pay tribute to Coil's music. The project This Immortal Coil was built step by step during five years with Yaël Naim, Bonnie Prince Billy, Yann Tiersen, Matt Elliott, DAAU, Chapelier Fou, Sylvain Chauveau, Christine Ott, Oktopus, Nightwood, David Donatien and Nicolas Jorio. The album "The Dark Age of Love" includes eleven Coil re-interpretations is released in October 2009.

Members

Ici, d'ailleurs... currently represents seventy-three artists:

 ABD
 Aldea / Chiossone
 Angélique Ionatos
 Amor Belhom Duo
 Arca
 Arnaud Michniak
 Barth
 Bästard
 Bästard / Yann Tiersen
 Bed
 Bruit Noir
 Rodolphe Burger / Olivier Cadiot
 Chapelier Fou
 David Chalmin
 David Delabrosse
 DDamage
 Deity Guns
 Dominique Petitgand
 Ensemble 0 / Moondog
 Eric Aldea
 EZ3kiel
 Fugu
 Gablé
 Geins't Naït & Laurent Petitgand
 Gravité Zéro
 Gontard!
 Headphone
 I&Fused
 Jean-Philippe Goude
 Julien Ribot
 KaS Product
 Lars
 Linky
 Louis Ville

 Madrid
 Les Marquises
 Matt Elliott / Third Eye Foundation
 Mathias Delplanque
 Melaine Dalibert
 Mendelson
 Mein Sohn William
 Michel Cloup Duo
 Mick Hart
 Micro:mega
 Miët
 Narcophony
 Nonstop
 Numbers Not Names
 Orchard
 ORKA
 Pascal Bouaziz
 Le Professeur Inlassable
 Programme
 Spade & Archer
 Steve Tallis & The Holly Ghosts
 Stefan Wesołowski
 Stranded Horse
 Sylvain Chauveau & Ensemble Nocturne
 The Digital Intervention
 The Married Monk
 The Shoppings
 The Third Eye Foundation
 This Immortal Coil
 Thomas Belhom
 Tomasz Sroczyński
 Trupa Trupa
 Uruk
 Variety Lab

 Winter Family
 Yann Tiersen
 Yann Tiersen & Shannon Wright
 Zëro
 Zëro & Virginie Despentes

Discography 

IDA001 - Yann Tiersen - La Valse des monstres - 1995
IDA002 - Yann Tiersen - Rue des cascades - 1996
IDA003 - Yann Tiersen - Le Phare - 1998
IDA004 - Bästard - Radiant, Discharged, Crossed Off
IDA005 - Bästard / Yann Tiersen - Untitled - 1999
IDA006 - Bästard - Untitled
IDA007 - Yann Tiersen / The Married Monk - Tout est calme - 1999
IDA008 - Fugu - Fugu 1 - 2001
IDA009 - Dominique Petitgand - Le sens de la mesure - 1999
IDA00A - Various Artistes - Ici, d'ailleurs Compilation - 1998
IDA00A# - Yann Tiersen - Black Session: Yann Tiersen
IDA010 - Bed - The New Plum - 2001
IDA011 - Madrid - Untitled - 2000
IDA012 - The Married Monk - Rocky - 2001
IDA013 - Amor Belhom Duo - Vavelab - 2001
IDA014 - Amor Belhom Duo - Untitled - 2000
IDA015 - Rodolphe Burger / Olivier Cadot - On n'est pas des indiens - 2000
IDA016 - Julien Ribot - Hôtel Bocchi - 2002
IDA017 - Dominique Petitgand - Rez de chaussée - 2001
IDA018 - Amor Belhom Duo - Live in Tucson - 2002
IDA019 - Dominique Petitgand - Le point de Côté - 2002
IDA020 - Bästard - The Acoustic Machine - 2003
IDA021 - Headphone - Work in Progress - 2003
IDA022 - Bed - Spacebox - 2003
IDA023 - Thomas Belhom - Remedios - 2004
IDA024 - Julien Ribot - La métamorphose de Caspar dix - 2004
IDA025 - The Married Monk - The Jim Side - 2004
IDA026 - Programme - Bogue - 2004
IDA027 - Matt Elliott - Drinking Songs - 2005
IDA028 - The Married Monk - Belgian Kick - 2004
IDA029 - Nonstop - Road movie en bequilles - 2005
IDA030 - Yann Tiersen / Shannon Wright - Yann Tiersen & Shannon Wright - 2004
IDA031 - Bed - New Lines - 2005
IDA032 - Dominique Petitgand - Le bout de la langue - 2006
IDA033 - Headphone - Two Stories High - 2006
IDA034 - Barth - Under the Trampoline - 2006
IDA035 - Bästard - Yet Reloaded... Live - 2006
IDA036 - Thomas Belhom - No Border - 2006
IDA037 - Matt Elliott - Failing Songs - 2007
IDA038 - Arca - On ne distinguait plus les têtes - 2007
IDA039 - Steve Tallis and The Holy Ghost - Loko - 2007
IDA040 - Julien Ribot - Vega - 2008
IDA041 - The Shoppings - Untitled - 2007
IDA042 - Arnaud Michniak - Poing perdu - 2007
IDA043 - Zëro - Go Stereo - 2007
IDA044 - Zëro - Joke Box - 2007
IDA045 - Barth - Cuchillo - 2008
IDA046 - The Married Monk - Elephant People - 2008
IDA047 - L'ensemble Jean-Philippe Goude - Aux solitudes - 2008
IDA048 - Yann Tiersen - Tabarly - 2008
IDA049 - Matt Elliott - Howling Songs - 2008
IDA050 - ORKA - Livandi oyða - 2008
IDA051 - Chapelier Fou - Darling, Darling, Darling - 2009
IDA052LP - Bästard - The Hunt - 1994/2008
IDA053LP - Bästard - Chinatown - 1995/2008
IDA054 - Barth - Cuchillo Revisited
IDA055 - Zëro - Bobby Fisher - 2009
IDA056 - Deity Guns - Recollection - 2009
IDA057 - Jean-Philippe Goude - Pour l'instant - 2009
IDA058 - Nonstop - J'ai rien compris mais je suis d'accord - 2009
IDA059 - Programme - Agent Réel - 2010
IDA060 - This Immortal Coil - The Dark Age of Love - 2009
IDA061 - Chapelier Fou - Scandale - 2009
IDA062 - Zëro - Dead Machine - 2009
IDA063 - Jean-Philippe Goude - De anima - 2010
IDA064 - Jean-Philippe Goude - Ainsi de nous - 2010
IDA065 - Jean-Philippe Goude - La divine nature des choses - 2010
IDA066 - Jean-Philippe Goude - Rock de chambre - 2010
IDA067 - Matt Elliott - Failed Songs - 2009
IDA068 - Chapelier Fou - 613 - 2010
IDA070 - Yann Tiersen - PALESTINE - 2008
IDA071 - The Third Eye Foundation - The Dark - 2010
IDA072 - Thomas Belhom - Rocéphine - 2012
IDA073 - Dälek - Absence - 2011
IDA074 - Dälek - From Filthy Tongue Of Gods And Griots - 2015
IDA075 - Numbers Not Name - What's The Price ? - 2012
IDA076 - Orka - Óró - 2011
IDA077 - Matt Elliott - The Broken Man - 2011
IDA078 - Chapelier Fou - Al Abama - 2011
IDA079 - Zëro - Hungry Dogs (In The Backyard) - 2011
IDA080 - Mein Sohn William - Mein Sohn William - 2012
IDA081 - Bästard - Acoustic Machine Vol.1 - 2011
IDA082 - Bästard - Acoustic Machine Vol.2 - 2011
IDA083 - Winter Family - Red Sugar 
- 2011
IDA084 - Chapelier Fou - Invisible - 2012
IDA084.1 - Chapelier Fou - Protest EP - 2014
IDA085 - Manyfingers / Matt Elliott - S/T - 2012
IDA086 - Numbers Not Names - Numbers Not Names - 2012
IDA087 - Thomas Belhom - Maritima - 2014
IDA087.1 - Thomas Belhom - Hungary / Porcelaine - 2014
IDA088 - Matt Elliott - The Mess We Made - 2013
IDA089 - Gablé - Murded - 2013
IDA090 - Mendelson - Mendelson - 2013
IDA091 - Michel Cloup Duo - Minuit Dans Tes Bras - 2014
IDA091_1 - Michel Cloup Duo - J'ai Peur De Nous - 2013
IDA091_2 - Michel Cloup Duo - Nous Vieillirons Ensemble - 2013
IDA092 - Matt Elliott - Only Myocardial Infarction Can Break Your Heart - 2013
IDA093 - Mendelson - Personne Ne Le Fera Pour Nous - 2013
IDA094 - Zëro - Places Where We Go In Dreams - 2014
IDA095 - Les Marquises - Pensée Magique - 2014
IDA096 - Peter Von Poehl - Vanishing Waves - 2013
IDA097 - Mein Sohn William - Ever Day, In Every Way - 2014
IDA098 - Chapelier Fou - Deltas - 2014
IDA098.1 - Chapelier Fou - Tea Tea Tea - 2014
IDA098.2 - Chapelier Fou - Fuses - 2015
IDA099 - Diabologum - #3 - 2015
IDA100 - David Chalmin - La Terre Invisible - 2019
IDA100.1 - David Chalmin - Continuum - 2020
IDA101 - EZ3kiel - Lux - 2014
IDA101.1 - EZ3kiel - Lux Continuum - 2014
IDA102 - Matt Elliott - The Calm Before - 2016
IDA103 - Bruit Noir - I / III - 2015
IDA104 - Angélique Ionatos - Reste La Lumière - 2015
IDA105 - Michel Cloup Duo - Live A La Gaïté Lyrique - 2015
IDA106 - Sylvain Chauveau - Down To The Bone (An Acoustic Tribute To Depeche Mode) - 2015
IDA107 - Julien Sagot - Valse 333 - 2015
IDA108 - Pascal Bouaziz - Haïkus - 2016
IDA109 - Les Marquises - A Night Full Of Collapses - 2017
IDA110 - Michel Cloup Duo - Ici Et Là-Bas - 2016
IDA111 - The Third Eye Foundation - Semxtex - 2016
IDA112 - Mendelson - L'Avenir Est Devant - 2016
IDA113 - Mendelson - Quelque Part - 2016
IDA114 - Gontard ! - Repeupler - 2016
IDA115 - EZ3kiel - Lux Live - 2016
IDA116 - Zëro - San Francisco - 2016
IDA117 - Gablé - JoLLy TrouBLe - 2016
IDA118 - Chapelier Fou - Kalia - 2016
IDA119 - The Third Eye Foundation - Wake The Dead - 2017
IDA120 - EZ3kiel - Re L.U.X - 2016
IDA121 - Winter Family - South From Here - 2017
IDA122 - Chapelier Fou - Muance - 2017
IDA123 - Michel Cloup Duo - Notre Silence - 2016
IDA124 - Deity Guns - Transline Appointment - 2017
IDA125 - Trupa Trupa - Headache - 2016
IDA126 - Michel Cloup Duo - Saison 1 (2010 - 2015) - 2016
IDA127 - Bästard - Radiant, Discharged, Crossed-Off - 2017
IDA128 - Zëro - 2007 - 2014 - 2017
IDA129 - Mendelson - Sciences Politiques - 2017
IDA130 - Chapelier Fou - ! - 2017
IDA131 - Chapelier Fou - 31+6 - 2017
IDA132 - Gontard ! - Tout Naît/Tout S'Achève Par Un Disque - 2017
IDA133 - The Married Monk - Headgearalienpoo - 2018
IDA134 - Zëro - Ain't That Mayhem - 2018
IDA135 - Julien Sagot - Bleu Jane - 2018
IDA136 - Trupa Trupa - Jolly New Songs - 2018
IDA137 - Elpmas (Moondog) Revisité - 2018
IDA139 - Bruit Noir - II / III - 2019
IDA140 - Michel Cloup Duo - Danser Danser Danser Sur Les Ruines - 2019
IDA141 - Matt Elliott - Farewell To All We Know - 2020
IDA142 - Gontard ! - 2029 - 2019
IDA143 - Miët - Stumbling, Climbing, Nesting - 2019
IDA144 - Chapelier Fou - Méridiens - 2020
IDA145 - Chapelier Fou - Parallèles - 2020
IDA146 - Diabologum - La Jeunesse Est Un Art - 2020
IDA146.1 - Diabologum - C'Etait Un Lundi Après-Midi Semblable Aux Autres - 2020
IDA146.2 - Diabologum - Le Goût Du Jour - 2020
IDA146.3 - Diabologum - L'Art Est Dans La Rue - 2020
IDA147 - Zëro / Despentes - Requiem Des Innocents - 2020
IDA148 - Michel Cloup / Julien Rufié / Pascal Bouaziz - A La Ligne - 2020
IDA149 - Mendelson - Le Dernier Album - 2021
IDA150 - Stranded Horse - Grand Rodéo - 2021
IDA151 - Gontard ! - Akène - 2021
IDA153 - DDamage - Radio Ape - 2021
IDA154 - Chapelier Fou - Ensemb7e - 2022
Oumupo1 - Third Eye Foundation & Gerner
Oumupo2 - Rob Swift & Lecroart
Oumupo3 - Rubin Steiner & Luz
Oumupo4 - Kid Loco & Menu
Oumupo5 - Dj Hide & Dupuy / Berberian
Oumupo6 - Dj Krush & Killofer
Oumupo Box P. - Box+6 Cd+Livret Anne Barraou
Oumupo Box V. - Box Vide+Livret Anne Barraou
0101.01 - Eric Aldea - Saturno o Cipolla ? - 2002
0101.02 - I N Fused - Kind of Clue - 2002
0101.03 - Micro : Mega - Annex - 2002
0101.04 - Variety Lab - Providence - 2003
0101.05 - Aldea / Chiossone - Narcophony - 2002
0101.06 - Gravité Zéro - Infini - 2003
0101.07 - Gravité Zéro - Gravité Zéro - 2003
0101.08 - Linky - Quiet Rooms - 2004
0101.09 - Le Professeur Inlassable - Leçon N°1 - 2004
0101.10 - Micro:mega - Where We Go Don't Need It Anymore - 2005
0101.11 - Narcophony - Kabul - 2005
0101.12 - Gravité Zéro - Remix - 2005
0101.13 - Narcophony - Plays The Residents - 2005
0101.14 - Spade & Archer - Highway to Jail - 2006
0101.15 - I&N Fused - Slow Eater - 2008
0101.PS1 - The Digital Intervention - Capture - 2003

Mind Travels 
MT01 - Geins't Naït & Laurent Petitgand - Je Vous Dis - 2014
MT02 - Manyfingers - The Spectacular Nowhere - 2015
MT03LP - Aidan Baker - The Sea Swells A Bit - 2015
MT04 - Stefan Wesolowski - Kompleta - 2015
MT05 - Geins't Naït & Laurent Petitgand - Oublier - 2015
MT06 - Mathias Delplanque - Drachen - 2015
MT07 - Stefan Wesolowski - Rite Of The End - 2017
MT08 - The Orchards - Serendipity - 2017
MT09 - Arca - Forces - 2018
MT11 - Uruk - Mysterium Coniunctionis - 2018
MT12 - Geins't Naït & Laurent Petitgand - Like This Maybe Or This - 2020
MT13 - Tomasz Sroczynski - Symphony N°2 - 2021

See also
 List of record labels: I–Q

References

External links
 

French independent record labels
Record labels established in 1997